The cast of the television series MythBusters perform experiments to verify or debunk urban legends, old wives' tales, and the like. This is a list of the various myths tested on the show as well as the results of the experiments (the myth is either busted, plausible, or confirmed). The 2015 season premiered on January 10, 2015, in a Saturday time slot. The first half of the season ended on February 14, after six episodes had aired. The second half of the season resumed on July 18, still in the Saturday time slot. The final episode of the second half aired on September 5, with eight episodes having aired, and a total fourteen episodes having aired in the season.

This is the first season without Kari Byron, Tory Belleci, and Grant Imahara since they originally appeared in the show. Hyneman and Savage are now the only hosts of the show. The opening narration and blueprint title cards have been removed as of this season, and the episodes are punctuated by pop-up bubbles with information relevant to the myths being tested.

Episode overview

Episode 223 – "The Simpsons Special"
 Original air date: January 10, 2015

Adam and Jamie investigate two scenes from the animated series The Simpsons. Showrunner and executive producer Al Jean makes a guest appearance.

Homer Wrecker

Toilet Bomb

Episode 224  – "Indiana Jones Special"
 Original air date: January 17, 2015

Adam and Jamie investigate two scenes from the film Raiders of the Lost Ark.

Temple Run

The Science of Whips

Episode 225 – "A-Team Special"
 Original air date: January 24, 2015

Adam and Jamie test two scenes from the television series The A-Team.

Log Shooter

Sewer Blast

Episode 226 – "Video Game Special"
 Original air date: January 31, 2015

Adam and Jamie test two video game scenarios.

Doom

Fruit Ninja

Episode 227 – "Transformers"
 Original air date: February 7, 2015

Adam and Jamie test myths related to vehicle transformation.

Motorcycle Car

Aqua Bike

Episode 228 – "San Francisco Drift"
 Original air date: February 14, 2015

Adam and Jamie test myths related to automotive drifting.

Drift Turn

Powerslide Parking

Episode 229 – "Blow It Out of the Water"
 Original air date: July 18, 2015

Adam and Jamie test two myths related to "blowing it out of the water", one literal and one metaphorical.

Boat Lift

Machine Gun Booby Trap
Before this episode, Jamie, Adam, Kari, Tory and Grant had busted two Breaking Bad myths from Season 1 on a Breaking Bad special in 2013: The use of hydrofluoric acid to completely dissolve a body and eat through a bathtub and a floor (from Cat's in the Bag) and the use of mercury fulminate to incapacitate attackers without harming the user (from Crazy Handful of Nothin'). Breaking Bad creator/director Vince Gilligan and co-star Aaron Paul (Jesse Pinkman) had appeared in the 2013 special.

Episode 230 – "Flights of Fantasy"
 Original air date: July 25, 2015

Adam and Jamie test two flight related myths.

U-2 Flight

Deadly Drones

Episode 231 – "Accidental Ammo"
 Original US air date: August 1, 2015
 Original Finland air date: May 27, 2015

Adam and Jamie test two myths of possibly lethal projectiles.

Lethal Lawnmowers

Glass Guillotine

Episode 232 – "Dangerous Driving"
 Original air date: August 8, 2015

The MythBusters test two myths related to driving, and how dangerous they are.

Distracted Driving

Driving in Reverse

Episode 233 – "Supernatural Shooters"
 Original US air date: August 15, 2015
 Original Netherlands and Belgium air date: May 10, 2015

Adam and Jamie test two myths related to unusual use of bullets. Actor Jonathan Banks, from Breaking Bad, makes a guest appearance.

Shooting Through Walls

Shoot 'Em Up Bullets

Episode 234 – "Unfinished Business"
 Original air date: August 22, 2015
Adam and Jamie revisit four past episodes to address viewers' disputes over myth results and suggestions for additional testing.

Video Game Skills

Spy Car Tacks

Get a Grip

Super Fast Reload

Episode 235 – "MythBusters vs. Jaws"
 Original air date: August 29, 2015

Adam and Jamie revisit a myth based on the film Jaws and test two new shark-based myths. This episode is part of Discovery's new two-day shark-themed weekend called "Shweekend".

Jaws Finale Revisit

Orca Shark Repellent

Dead Shark Repellent

Episode 236 – "Star Wars 2"
 Original air date: September 5, 2015

For the second time, the MythBusters explore sagas related to the Star Wars universe with two more myths.

Blaster Dodge

High Ground

Notes

References

General references

External links

 
 

2015
2015 American television seasons